Henry "Butch" Miller (born June 5, 1952) is an American retired stock car racing driver. He is a multi-time champion in the now-defunct American Speed Association stock car series.

NASCAR

Early career 
In 1985, Miller ran his first Busch Series races, driving for LeRoy Throop, driving the No. 08 MSW Spyders Pontiac in four events. He made four races, and had a 2nd-place finish at Bristol Motor Speedway. The next year, in 1986, he went to victory lane at the Indianapolis Raceway Park. That same season, he made his Winston Cup debut, finishing 16th in his first race. He ran two Cup races the next season for Throop, and then two races in the No. 31 Slender You Figure Salons Oldsmobile for Bob Clark in 1988. In 1989, he returned to Throop in the No. 51 for nine races. Despite getting sponsorship from Fruit of the Loom, he was only able to finish two races. He signed with Travis Carter Enterprises to drive the No. 98 Chevrolet Lumina for 1990, with sponsorship from Banquet Foods, IGA, and Piggy Wiggly. He drove in the first 23 races of the season, and had a career-best 8th-place finish at Pocono Raceway, but was released near the end of the season.

He ran his first full Busch Series season in 1991, beginning in the No. 52 31-W Insulation Oldsmobile/Chevy with Day Enterprise Racing. He won his most recent race early in the season at Hickory, but left in the middle of the season to join the No. 75 Food Country U.S.A. Oldsmobile for Henderson Motorsports. In 1992, as he scored 10 top tens and finished 7th in points. He ran nine races in 1993 before he was released, and spent the rest of the season out of NASCAR. He ran two Cup races in 1994, driving the No. 55 Ford Thunderbird for RaDiUs Racing.

Truck Series 
In 1995, he joined the fledgling Craftsman Truck Series, driving the No. 98 Raybestos Ford for Liberty Racing. He won a race at Colorado National Speedway beating Mike Skinner by 0.001 seconds in the closest finish in series history and finished 4th in points. He continued to run full-time through 1998. He stayed with Herrick until the latter part of 1996, where he ran some races for Ernie Irvan and Walker Evans. He signed with Evans full-time for the 1997, where he had twelve top-tens in the No. 20 Orleans Hotel & Casino Ford. In 1998, Miller moved to L&R Racing as driver of the No. 18 Dana Dodge Ram. He fell to fifteenth in points, but took the No. 18 and Dana to Bobby Hamilton Racing for the 1999 season. Miller made nine races in 1999 for Hamilton when he resigned from the team to move back to the Busch Series, replacing Stanton Barrett in the No. 40 Channellock Chevy for Galaxy Motorsports. He had two top-ten finishes in six starts, but after two consecutive DNQ's, he was released.

Miller also won the Snowball Derby, a prestigious late model race, in 1987.

Return to racing 
After that season, Miller stayed out of driving until 2002, serving briefly as crew chief for Larry Foyt's ASA team, as well serving as a broadcaster for ASA races. He returned to the Truck Series at Daytona International Speedway, finishing seventeenth in the No. 61 Delco Remy/Team Rensi Motorsports Chevrolet Silverado. A few weeks later, he returned to Henderson and the Busch Series and made ten starts, his best finish being a fifteenth. After another year out of the series, he returned to drive a pair of Truck races in the No. 20 Timber Wolf for Ken Weaver and No. 08 ASI Limited for Gene Christensen, respectively. The following season, he drove in three races for Green Light Racing, and had a tenth-place finish at Mansfield Motorsports Park. He ran another pair of races for Green Light in 2006, but could not finish higher than 26th. After another season off, he drove in nine races for Green Light in the No. 0/No. 07 Silverado for SS-Green Light, but did not finish a race. Miller drove for SS-Green Light on and off between 2009–2011, but primarily served under the role of crew chief to the multitude of young drivers piloting the No. 07.

Motorsports career results

NASCAR
(key) (Bold – Pole position awarded by qualifying time. Italics – Pole position earned by points standings or practice time. * – Most laps led.)

Winston Cup Series

Daytona 500

Busch Series

Camping World Truck Series

ARCA Talladega SuperCar Series
(key) (Bold – Pole position awarded by qualifying time. Italics – Pole position earned by points standings or practice time. * – Most laps led.)

References

External links
 
 

Living people
1952 births
People from Ottawa County, Michigan
Racing drivers from Michigan
NASCAR drivers
American Speed Association drivers
Motorsport announcers
ARCA Menards Series drivers